Cyperus microbrunneus is a species of sedge that is native to Central America and southern parts of Mexico.

See also 
 List of Cyperus species

References 

microbrunneus
Plants described in 1983
Flora of Mexico
Flora of Costa Rica
Flora of Guatemala
Flora of Honduras